is the fifth studio album by the Japanese rock band Buck-Tick. It was released on cassette and CD on February 1, 1990, through Victor Entertainment. It peaked at number one on the Oricon charts and is the group's best-selling album to date. It was certified gold in the month of its release, and sold 435,080 copies in the first year of its release. The title comes from Charles Baudelaire's volume of poetry, Les Fleurs du mal.

Releases
The album was digitally remastered and re-released on September 19, 2002, with two bonus tracks. It was remastered and re-released again on September 5, 2007. "Aku no Hana" and "Love Me" were later re-recorded for the group's compilation album Koroshi no Shirabe: This Is Not Greatest Hits (1992).

On February 1, 2014, Aku no Hana was re-released again as a digital remaster to celebrate 25 years since its release, giving the songs the sound they imagined and would like them to originally have but couldn't due to limits of the equipment. It was released in three editions: a regular edition remastered album, a video album of the music videos, and a remastered limited edition collector's set format called 惡の華 -Completeworks-. The last contained the album as a vinyl LP, photo cards, remasters of the music videos from the album on DVD and Blu-ray, the 2015 Re-mix album as a Platinum SHM CD, and the 惡の華/Under The Moonlight 2015 Re-mix single also as a Platinum SHM CD.

Track listing

Personnel
 Atsushi Sakurai – lead vocals
 Hisashi Imai – lead guitar, backing vocals
 Hidehiko Hoshino – rhythm guitar, backing vocals
 Yutaka Higuchi – bass
 Toll Yagami – drums

Additional performers
 Tsutomu Nakayama – keyboards

Production
 Tsutomu Nakayama; Buck-Tick – producers
 Will Gosling – engineer, mixing
 Jun Kanazawa – assistant engineer
 Ken Sakaguchi – cover art, graphic design
 Bruno Dayan – photography

References

Buck-Tick albums
Victor Entertainment albums
1990 albums